Francis I (12 September 1494 – 31 March 1547) was King of France from 1515 until his death in 1547. He was the son of Charles, Count of Angoulême, and Louise of Savoy. He succeeded his first cousin once removed and father-in-law Louis XII, who died without a son. 

A prodigious patron of the arts, he promoted the emergent French Renaissance by attracting many Italian artists to work for him, including Leonardo da Vinci, who brought the Mona Lisa with him, which Francis had acquired. Francis' reign saw important cultural changes with the growth of central power in France, the spread of humanism and Protestantism, and the beginning of French exploration of the New World. Jacques Cartier and others claimed lands in the Americas for France and paved the way for the expansion of the first French colonial empire.

In keeping with his predecessors, Francis continued the Italian Wars. The succession of his great rival Emperor Charles V to the Habsburg Netherlands and the throne of Spain, followed by his election as Holy Roman Emperor, led to France being geographically encircled by the Habsburg monarchy. In his struggle against Imperial hegemony, Francis sought the support of Henry VIII of England at the Field of the Cloth of Gold. When this was unsuccessful, he formed a Franco-Ottoman alliance with the Muslim sultan Suleiman the Magnificent, a controversial move for a Christian king at the time.

Early life and Accession
Francis of Orléans was born on 12 September 1494 at the Château de Cognac in the town of Cognac, which at that time lay in the province of Saintonge, a part of the Duchy of Aquitaine.  Today the town lies in the department of Charente.

Francis was the only son of Charles of Orléans, Count of Angoulême, and Louise of Savoy, and a great-great-grandson of King Charles V of France. His family was not expected to inherit the throne, as his third cousin King Charles VIII was still young at the time of his birth, as was his father's cousin the Duke of Orléans, later King Louis XII. However, Charles VIII died childless in 1498 and was succeeded by Louis XII, who himself had no male heir. The Salic Law prevented women from inheriting the throne.  Therefore, the four-year-old Francis (who was already Count of Angoulême after the death of his own father two years earlier) became the heir presumptive to the throne of France in 1498 and was vested with the title of Duke of Valois.

In 1505, Louis XII, having fallen ill, ordered for his daughter Claude and Francis to be married immediately, but only through an assembly of nobles were the two engaged. Claude was heir presumptive to the Duchy of Brittany through her mother, Anne of Brittany. Following Anne's death, the marriage took place on 18 May 1514. On 1 January 1515, Louis died, and Francis inherited the throne. He was crowned King of France in the Cathedral of Reims on 25 January 1515, with Claude as his queen consort.

Reign

As Francis was receiving his education, ideas emerging from the Italian Renaissance were influential in France. Some of his tutors, such as François Desmoulins de Rochefort (his Latin instructor, who later during the reign of Francis was named ) and Christophe de Longueil (a Brabantian humanist), were attracted by these new ways of thinking and attempted to influence Francis. His academic education had been in arithmetic, geography, grammar, history, reading, spelling, and writing and he became proficient in Hebrew, Italian, Latin and Spanish. Francis came to learn chivalry, dancing, and music, and he loved archery, falconry, horseback riding, hunting, jousting, real tennis and wrestling. He ended up reading philosophy and theology and he was fascinated with art, literature, poetry and science. His mother, who had a high admiration for Italian Renaissance art, passed this interest on to her son. Although Francis did not receive a humanist education, he was more influenced by humanism than any previous French king.

Patron of the arts

By the time he ascended the throne in 1515, the Renaissance had arrived in France, and Francis became an enthusiastic patron of the arts. At the time of his accession, the royal palaces of France were ornamented with only a scattering of great paintings, and not a single sculpture, not ancient nor modern.

Francis patronized many great artists of his time, including Andrea del Sarto and Leonardo da Vinci; the latter of whom was persuaded to make France his home during his last years. While da Vinci painted very little during his years in France, he brought with him many of his greatest works, including the Mona Lisa (known in France as ), and these remained in France after his death. Other major artists to receive Francis' patronage included the goldsmith Benvenuto Cellini and the painters Rosso Fiorentino, Giulio Romano, and Primaticcio, all of whom were employed in decorating Francis' various palaces. He also invited the noted architect Sebastiano Serlio (1475–1554), who enjoyed a fruitful late career in France. Francis also commissioned a number of agents in Italy to procure notable works of art and ship them to France.

Man of letters
Francis was also renowned as a man of letters. When Francis comes up in a conversation among characters in Baldassare Castiglione's Book of the Courtier, it is as the great hope to bring culture to the war-obsessed French nation. Not only did Francis support a number of major writers of the period, but he was also a poet himself, if not one of particular abilities. Francis worked diligently at improving the royal library. He appointed the great French humanist Guillaume Budé as chief librarian and began to expand the collection. Francis employed agents in Italy to look for rare books and manuscripts, just as he had agents looking for artworks. During his reign, the size of the library greatly increased. Not only did he expand the library, there is also evidence that he read the books he bought for it, a much rarer event in the royal annals. Francis set an important precedent by opening his library to scholars from around the world in order to facilitate the diffusion of knowledge.

Francis' older sister, Marguerite, Queen of Navarre, was also an accomplished writer who produced the classic collection of short stories known as the Heptameron. Francis corresponded with the abbess and philosopher Claude de Bectoz, of whose letters he was so fond that he would carry them around and show them to the ladies of his court.
Together with his sister, he visited her in Tarascon.

Construction

Francis poured vast amounts of money into new structures. Early in his reign, he began construction of the magnificent , inspired by the architectural styles of the Italian renaissance, and perhaps even designed by Leonardo da Vinci. Francis rebuilt the Louvre Palace, transforming it from a medieval fortress into a building of Renaissance splendour. He financed the building of a new City Hall (the ) for Paris in order to have control over the building's design. Each of Francis' projects was luxuriously decorated both inside and out. Fontainebleau, for instance, had a gushing fountain in its courtyard where quantities of wine were mixed with the water.

Military action

Although the Italian Wars (1494–1559) came to dominate the reign of Francis I, the wars were not the sole focus of his policies. Francis merely continued the incessant wars that his predecessors had started and that his successors on the throne of France would drag on after Francis' death. Indeed, the Italian Wars had begun when Milan sent a plea to King Charles VIII of France for protection against the aggressive actions of the King of Naples. Militarily and diplomatically, Francis' reign was a mixed bag of success and failure.  Francis tried and failed to become Holy Roman Emperor at the Imperial election of 1519.  However, there were also temporary victories, such as in the portion of the Italian Wars called the War of the League of Cambrai (1508–1516) and, more specifically, to the final stage of that war, which history refers to simply as "Francis' First Italian War" (1515–1516), when Francis routed the combined forces of the Papal States and the Old Swiss Confederacy at Marignano on 13–15 September 1515. This victory at Marignano allowed Francis to capture the Italian city-state of Milan. Later, in November 1521, during the Four Years' War (1521–1526) and facing the advancing Imperial forces of the Holy Roman Empire and open revolt within Milan, Francis was forced to abandon Milan, thus, cancelling the triumph at Marignano.

Much of the military activity of Francis's reign was focused on his sworn enemy, the Holy Roman Emperor Charles V. Francis and Charles maintained an intensely personal rivalry. Charles, in fact, brashly challenged Francis to single combat multiple times. In addition to the Holy Roman Empire, Charles personally ruled Spain, Austria, and a number of smaller possessions neighbouring France. He was thus a constant threat to Francis' kingdom.

Francis attempted to arrange an alliance with Henry VIII of England at the famous meeting at the Field of Cloth of Gold on 7 June 1520, but despite a lavish fortnight of diplomacy they failed to reach an agreement. Francis and Henry were both obsessed with dreams of power and chivalric glory; their relationship featured intense personal and dynastic rivalry. Francis was driven by his intense eagerness for retaking Milan, despite the strong opposition of other Powers. Henry was likewise determined to recapture northern France, which Francis could never allow.

Francis suffered his most devastating defeat at the Battle of Pavia on 24 February 1525, during part of the continuing Italian Wars known as the Four Years' War. Francis was actually taken prisoner: Cesare Hercolani injured his horse, and Francis was captured by Diego Dávila, Alonso Pita da Veiga, and Juan de Urbieta, from Guipúzcoa. For this reason, Hercolani was named "Victor of the battle of Pavia".  was supposedly invented on the spot to feed the captive king right after the battle.

Francis I was held captive in Madrid. In a letter to his mother he wrote, "Of all things, nothing remains to me but honour and life, which is safe." This line has come down in history famously as "All is lost save honour." Francis made major concessions to Charles V in the Treaty of Madrid (1526), signed on 14 January, before he was freed on 17 March. An ultimatum from Ottoman Sultan Suleiman to Charles V also played an important role in his release. Francis I surrendered any claims to Naples and Milan in Italy. Francis recognised the independence of the Duchy of Burgundy, which had been part of France since the death of Charles the Bold in 1477. And finally, Francis was betrothed to Charles' sister Eleanor. Francis was allowed to return to France in exchange for his two sons, Francis and Henry, but once he was free he argued that his agreement with Charles was made under duress. He also claimed that the agreement was void because his sons were taken hostage with the implication that his word alone could not be trusted. Thus he firmly repudiated it. A renewed alliance with England enabled Francis to repudiate the treaty of Madrid.

Francis persevered in his hatred of Charles V and his desire to control Italy. By the mid-1520s, Pope Clement VII wished to liberate Italy from foreign domination, especially that of Charles V, so he allied with Venice to form the League of Cognac. Francis joined the League in May 1526, in the War of the League of Cognac of 1526–30. Francis' allies proved weak, and the war was ended by the Treaty of Cambrai (1529; "the Peace of the Ladies", negotiated by Francis’ mother and Charles’ aunt). The two boys were released, and Francis married Eleanor.

After the League of Cognac failed, Francis concluded a secret alliance with the Landgrave of Hesse on 27 January 1534. This was directed against Charles V on the pretext of assisting the Duke of Württemberg to regain his traditional seat, from which Charles had removed him in 1519. Francis also obtained the help of the Ottoman Empire and after the death of Francesco II Sforza, ruler of Milan, renewed the contest in Italy in the Italian War of 1536–1538. This round of fighting, which had little result, was ended by the Truce of Nice. The agreement collapsed, however, which led to Francis' final attempt on Italy in the Italian War of 1542–1546. This time Francis managed to hold off the forces of Charles V and Henry VIII. Charles V was forced to sign the Treaty of Crépy because of his financial difficulties and conflicts with the Schmalkaldic League.

Relations with the New World and Asia

Francis had been much aggrieved at the papal bull : in June 1481 Portuguese rule over Africa and the Indies was confirmed by Pope Sixtus IV. Thirteen years later, on 7 June 1494, Portugal and the Crown of Castille signed the Treaty of Tordesillas under which the newly discovered lands would be divided between the two signatories. All this prompted King Francis to declare, "The sun shines for me as it does for others. I would very much like to see the clause of Adam’s will by which I should be denied my share of the world."

In order to counterbalance the power of the Habsburg Empire under Charles V, especially its control of large parts of the New World through the Crown of Spain, Francis I endeavoured to develop contacts with the New World and Asia. Fleets were sent to the Americas and the Far East, and close contacts were developed with the Ottoman Empire permitting the development of French Mediterranean trade as well as the establishment of a strategic military alliance.

The port city now known as Le Havre was founded in 1517 during the early years of Francis' reign. The construction of a new port was urgently needed in order to replace the ancient harbours of Honfleur and Harfleur, whose utility had decreased due to silting. Le Havre was originally named Franciscopolis after the King who founded it, but this name did not survive into later reigns.

Americas

In 1524, Francis assisted the citizens of Lyon in financing the expedition of Giovanni da Verrazzano to North America. On this expedition, Verrazzano visited the present site of New York City, naming it New Angoulême, and claimed Newfoundland for the French crown. Verrazzano's letter to Francis of 8 July 1524 is known as the Cèllere Codex.

In 1531, Bertrand d'Ornesan tried to establish a French trading post at Pernambuco, Brazil.

In 1534, Francis sent Jacques Cartier to explore the St. Lawrence River in Quebec to find "certain islands and lands where it is said there must be great quantities of gold and other riches". In 1541, Francis sent Jean-François de Roberval to settle Canada and to provide for the spread of "the Holy Catholic faith."

Far East Asia

French trade with East Asia was initiated during the reign of Francis I with the help of shipowner Jean Ango. In July 1527, a French Norman trading ship from the city of Rouen is recorded by the Portuguese João de Barros as having arrived in the Indian city of Diu. Upon its return, the expedition triggered the development of the Dieppe maps, influencing the work of Dieppe cartographers such as Jean Rotz.

Ottoman Empire

In a watershed moment in European diplomacy, Francis came to an understanding with the Ottoman Empire that developed into a Franco-Ottoman alliance. The objective for Francis was to find an ally against the House of Habsburg. The pretext used by Francis was the protection of the Christians in Ottoman lands. The alliance has been called "the first nonideological diplomatic alliance of its kind between a Christian and non-Christian empire". It did, however, cause quite a scandal in the Christian world and was designated "the impious alliance", or "the sacrilegious union of the [French] Lily and the [Ottoman] Crescent." Nevertheless, it endured for many years, since it served the objective interests of both parties. The two powers colluded against Charles V, and in 1543 they even combined for a joint naval assault in the Siege of Nice.

In 1533, Francis I sent colonel Pierre de Piton as ambassador to Morocco, initiating official France-Morocco relations. In a letter to Francis I dated 13 August 1533, the Wattassid ruler of Fez, Ahmed ben Mohammed, welcomed French overtures and granted freedom of shipping and protection of French traders.

Bureaucratic reform and language policy

Francis took several steps to eradicate the monopoly of Latin as the language of knowledge. Students at the Collège could study Greek, Hebrew and Aramaic, then Arabic under Guillaume Postel beginning in 1539.

In 1539, in his castle in Villers-Cotterêts, Francis signed the important edict known as Ordinance of Villers-Cotterêts, which, among other reforms, made French the administrative language of the kingdom as a replacement for Latin. This same edict required priests to register births, marriages, and deaths, and to establish a registry office in every parish. This initiated the first records of vital statistics with filiations available in Europe.

Religious policies
Divisions in Christianity in Western Europe during Francis' reign created lasting international rifts. Martin Luther's preaching and writing sparked the Protestant Reformation, which spread through much of Europe, including France.

Initially Francis was relatively tolerant of the new movement, despite burning several heretics at the Place Maubert in 1523. He was influenced by his beloved sister Marguerite de Navarre, who was genuinely attracted by Luther's theology. Francis even considered it politically useful, as it caused many German princes to turn against his enemy Charles V. 

Francis' attitude towards Protestantism changed for the worse following the "Affair of the Placards", on the night of 17 October 1534, in which notices appeared on the streets of Paris and other major cities denouncing the Catholic mass. The most fervent Catholics were outraged by the notice's allegations. Francis himself came to view the movement as a plot against him and began to persecute its followers. Protestants were jailed and executed. In some areas, whole villages were destroyed. In Paris, after 1540, Francis had heretics such as Étienne Dolet tortured and burned. Printing was censored and leading Protestant reformers such as John Calvin were forced into exile. The persecutions soon numbered thousands of dead and tens of thousands of homeless.

Persecutions against Protestants were codified in the Edict of Fontainebleau (1540) issued by Francis. Major acts of violence continued, as when Francis ordered the execution of one of the historical pre-Lutheran groups, the Waldensians, at the Massacre of Mérindol in 1545.

Death
It is said that "he died complaining about the weight of a crown that he had first perceived as a gift from God". He was interred with his first wife, Claude, Duchess of Brittany, in Saint Denis Basilica. He was succeeded by his son, Henry II.

Francis' tomb and that of his wife and mother, along with the tombs of other French kings and members of the royal family, were desecrated on 20 October 1793 during the Reign of Terror at the height of the French Revolution.

Image and reputation

Francis I has a poor reputation in France—his 500th anniversary was little noted in 1994. Popular and scholarly historical memory ignores his building of so many fine chateaux, his stunning art collection, and his lavish patronage of scholars and artists. He is seen as a playboy who disgraced France by allowing himself to be defeated and taken prisoner at Pavia. The historian Jules Michelet set the negative image.

British historian Glenn Richardson considers Francis a success:
He was a king who ruled as well as reigned. He knew the importance of war and a high international profile in staking his claim to be a great warrior-king of France. In battle he was brave, if impetuous, which led equally to triumph and disaster. Domestically, Francis exercised the spirit and letter of the royal prerogative to its fullest extent. He bargained hard over taxation and other issues with interest groups, often by appearing not to bargain at all. He enhanced royal power and concentrated decision-making in a tight personal executive but used a wide range of offices, gifts and his own personal charisma to build up an elective personal affinity among the ranks of the nobility upon whom his reign depended .... Under Francis, the court of France was at the height of its prestige and international influence during the 16th century. Although opinion has varied considerably over the centuries since his death, his cultural legacy to France, to its Renaissance, was immense and ought to secure his reputation as among the greatest of its kings.

Marriage and issue
On 18 May 1514, Francis married his second cousin Claude, the daughter of King Louis XII of France and Duchess Anne of Brittany. The couple had seven children:
 Louise (19 August 1515 – 21 September 1518): died young; engaged to Charles I of Spain almost from birth until death.
 Charlotte (23 October 1516 – 8 September 1524): died young; engaged to Charles I of Spain from 1518 until death.
 Francis (28 February 1518 – 10 August 1536): succeeded his mother Claude as Duke of Brittany, but died aged 18, unmarried with illegitimate issue.
 Henry II (31 March 1519 – 10 July 1559): succeeded his father Francis I as King of France and his brother Francis as Duke of Brittany. Married Catherine de' Medici and had issue.
 Madeleine (10 August 1520 – 2 July 1537): married James V of Scotland and had no issue.
 Charles (22 January 1522 – 9 September 1545): died unmarried and childless.
 Margaret (5 June 1523 – 14 September 1574): married Emmanuel Philibert, Duke of Savoy and had issue.

On 7 July 1530, Francis I married his second wife Eleanor of Austria, Queen (widow) of Portugal ,
a sister of Emperor Charles V. The couple had no children. 

During his reign, Francis kept two official mistresses at court. The first was Françoise de Foix, Countess of Châteaubriant. In 1526, she was replaced by the blonde-haired, cultured Anne de Pisseleu d'Heilly, Duchess of Étampes, who, with the death of Queen Claude two years earlier, wielded far more political power at court than her predecessor had done. Another of his earlier mistresses was allegedly Mary Boleyn, mistress of King Henry VIII and sister of Henry's future wife, Anne Boleyn.

Francis I in films, stage and literature
The amorous exploits of Francis inspired the 1832 play by Fanny Kemble, Francis the First, and the 1832 play by Victor Hugo,  ("The King's Amusement"), which featured the jester Triboulet, the inspiration for the 1851 opera Rigoletto by Giuseppe Verdi.

Francis was first played in the George Méliès short  (1907) by an unknown actor, possibly Méliès. He has been since played by Claude Garry (1910), William Powell (1922), Aimé Simon-Girard (1937), Sacha Guitry (1937), Gérard Oury (1953), Jean Marais (1955), Pedro Armendáriz (1956), Claude Titre (1962), Bernard Pierre Donnadieu (1990), Timothy West (1998), and Emmanuel Leconte (2007– 2010).

Francis was portrayed by Peter Gilmore in the comedy Carry On Henry charting the fictitious two extra wives of Henry VIII (including Marie, cousin of King Francis).

Francis receives a mention in Laurence Sterne's novel Tristram Shandy. The narrator claims that the king, wishing to win the favour of Switzerland, offers to make the country the godmother of his son. When, however, their choice of name conflicts, he declares war.

He is also mentioned in Jean de la Brète's novel , where the main character Reine de Lavalle idolises Francis after reading a biography of the king, much to the dismay of the local priest.

He often receives mentions in novels on the lives of Mary and Anne Boleyn, both of whom were educated at his court. Mary had, according to several accounts, been Francis' one-time mistress and Anne had been a favourite of his sister: the novels The Lady in the Tower, The Other Boleyn Girl, The Last Boleyn, Dear Heart, How Like You This? and Mademoiselle Boleyn feature Francis. He appears in Hilary Mantel's Wolf Hall about Henry VIII's minister Thomas Cromwell and is often referred to in its sequel, Bring Up the Bodies.

Francis is portrayed in Diane Haeger's novel Courtesan about Diane de Poitiers and Henri II.

Samuel Shellabarger's novel The King's Cavalier describes Francis the man, and the cultural and political circumstances of his reign, in some detail.

He and his court set the scene for Friedrich Schiller's ballad  (The Glove).

Francis I (Timothy West) and his son Henry II (Dougray Scott) are central figures in the 1998 movie Ever After, a retelling of the Cinderella story. The plot includes Leonardo da Vinci (Patrick Godfrey) arriving at court with the Mona Lisa.

He is played by Alfonso Bassave in the TVE series , opposite Álvaro Cervantes as Charles V.

Colm Meaney portrays the king in The Serpent Queen, which premiered on Starz in 2022.

Ancestors

See also

 Castell del Patriarca
 Franco-Ottoman alliance

References

Further reading
 Clough, C.H. "Francis I and the Courtiers of Castiglione’s Courtier." European Studies Review. vol. 8, 1978.
 Denieul-Cormier, Anne. The Renaissance in France. trans. Anne Fremantle and Christopher Fremantle. London: George Allen and Unwin Ltd., 1969.
 Frieda, Leonie. Francis I: The Maker of Modern France. New York: HarperCollins, 2018.
 Grant, Arthur James. The French Monarchy, Volume I. New York: Howard Fertig, 1970.
 Guy, John. Tudor England. Oxford: Oxford University Press, 1988.
 Isom-Verhaaren, Christine. "'Barbarossa and His Army Who Came to Succor All of Us': Ottoman and French Views of Their Joint Campaign of 1543–1544." French Historical Studies 30:3 (2007): 395–425 online.
 Jensen, De Lamar. "The Ottoman Turks in Sixteenth Century French Diplomacy," Sixteenth Century Journal 16:4 (1985): 451–470. online
 Jensen, De Lamar, ed. Renaissance Europe: Age of Recovery and Reconciliation. Lexington, Massachusetts: D.C. Heath and Company (2nd ed. 1991).
 Knecht, R.J. Renaissance Warrior and Patron: The Reign of Francis I. Cambridge: Cambridge University Press, 1994. Francis%20I&f=false online
 Knecht, Robert J. "A Battle of Giants." History Today (2016) 88#1, pp. 49–54 on Battle of Marignano, Italy in 1515.
 Knecht, R.J. Francis I (Cambridge University Press, 1982) online
 Knecht, R.J. French Renaissance Monarchy: Francis I and Henry II (2nd ed. 1997), historiography  excerpt
 Knecht, R.J. "An Update on the Reign of Francis I." History Compass 1.1 (2003) pp. 1–9.
 Knecht, R.J. "Francis and Paris" History 66#216 (1981) online
 Knecht, Robert J. "'Born between two women ...' Jules Michelet and Francis I." Renaissance Studies (2000) 14#3: 329–343 online.
 Major, J. Russell. From Renaissance Monarchy to Absolute Monarchy. (Johns Hopkins University Press, 1994).
 Mansfield, Lisa. Representations of Renaissance Monarchy: Francis I and the Image-Makers (2016).
 Norwich, John Julius. Four Princes: Henry VIII, Francis I, Charles V, Suleiman the Magnificent and the Obsessions that Forged Modern Europe. (Grove Press, 2016).
 Parker, Geoffrey. Emperor: A New Life of Charles V (Yale University Press, 2019).
 Potter, D. L. Renaissance France at War: Armies, Culture and Society, c. 1480–1560 (Woodbridge, UK: Boydell Press, 2008).
 Reston Jr., James. Defenders of the Faith: Christianity and Islam Battle for the Soul of Europe, 1520–1536 (Penguin, 2009), popular history.
 Richardson, Glenn. "Le roi-chevalier." History Today (May 2015) 65#5, pp. 39–45.
 Richardson, Glenn. "The Field of the Cloth of Gold" History Today (July 2020) 70#7 pp. 28–39.
 Richardson, Glenn. The Field of the Cloth of Gold (New Haven, Connecticut: Yale University Press, 2014).  
 Richardson, Glenn. "Good Friends and Brothers? Francis I and Henry VIII" History Today (1994) 44#9 pp. 20–26.
 Seward, Desmond. Prince of the Renaissance: The Life of François I (New York: Macmillan, 1973). online

External links
 

|-

|-

|-

|-

|-

 
1494 births
1547 deaths
16th-century kings of France
16th-century dukes of Brittany
Ancien Régime
Counts of Angoulême
Dukes of Milan
Dukes of Valois
French people of Cypriot descent
French Roman Catholics
Heirs presumptive to the French throne
House of Valois-Angoulême
Knights of the Garter
Knights of the Golden Fleece
People from Cognac, France
Burials at the Basilica of Saint-Denis
1510s in France
1520s in France
1530s in France
1540s in France
15th-century peers of France
16th-century peers of France
French art patrons
Monarchs taken prisoner in wartime